Sailing was contested at the 1999 Summer Universiade in Palma de Mallorca, Spain.

Medal summary

Medallists

Sources
 Sailing results at the 1999 Summer Universiade

1999 Summer Universiade
Sailing at the Summer Universiade
Sailing competitions in Spain